Bjørke Church (also known as Storfjorden kyrkje) is a parish church of the Church of Norway in the municipality of Volda in Møre og Romsdal county, Norway. It is located in the village of Bjørke at the innermost end of the Hjørundfjorden (which is known as the Storfjorden). It is the church for the Storfjorden parish which is part of the Søre Sunnmøre prosti (deanery) in the Diocese of Møre. The white, wooden church was built in a long church design in 1920 using plans drawn up by the architect Mathias Brække. The church seats about 200 people.  The church was consecrated on 16 September 1920 by Bishop Peter Hognestad.

History
Bjørke Chapel was originally designed by Mathias Brække and it was built by the builders Sivert Gjerdsdal and Edvard Gjerdsdal. Construction began in 1919 and the new building was completed in 1920. It was consecrated by the Bishop on 16 September 1920. The building is a wooden long church with a rectangular nave and a smaller, rectangular chancel on the east end of the nave. The west end has a church porch with a tower. The building was originally an annex chapel under the main Hjørundfjord Church but in 1929 it was upgraded to the status of parish church.

Media gallery

See also
List of churches in Møre

References

Volda
Churches in Møre og Romsdal
Wooden churches in Norway
Long churches in Norway
20th-century Church of Norway church buildings
Churches completed in 1920
1920 establishments in Norway